The 5 EPs is a compilation album by English post-rock band Disco Inferno, released in September 2011 on One Little Indian Records in the United Kingdom, and in November 2011 in the United States.  As the title indicates, it is a collection of five Disco Inferno EPs – Summer's Last Sound (1992), A Rock to Cling To (1993), The Last Dance (1993), Second Language (1994), and It's a Kid's World (1994). All material included on the EPs is provided on the album in chronological order of release.

Track listing

Personnel
Ian Crause – vocals, guitar
Paul Wilmott – bass guitar
Rob Whatley  – drums

References

Disco Inferno (band) albums
2011 compilation albums